General elections were held in Saint Vincent and the Grenadines on 19 May 1967, less than a year after the previous elections. The result was a victory for the Saint Vincent Labour Party, which won six of the nine seats. Voter turnout was 82.6%.

Results

References

Saint Vincent
Elections in Saint Vincent and the Grenadines
1967 in Saint Vincent and the Grenadines